The women's 800 metres event at the 2002 World Junior Championships in Athletics was held in Kingston, Jamaica, at National Stadium on 17 and 19 July.

Medalists

Results

Final
19 July

Heats
17 July

Heat 1

Heat 2

Heat 3

Participation
According to an unofficial count, 19 athletes from 17 countries participated in the event.

References

800 metres
800 metres at the World Athletics U20 Championships